The 2016 Tour de Langkawi was the 21st edition of an annual professional road bicycle racing stage race held in Malaysia since 1996. The race was run at the highest category apart from those races which make up the UCI World Tour, and was rated by the Union Cycliste Internationale (UCI) as a 2.HC (hors category) race as part of the UCI Asia Tour.

Teams

22 teams accepted invitations to participate in the 2016 Tour de Langkawi. Three UCI WorldTeams were invited to the race, along with eight UCI Professional Continental and ten UCI Continental teams. The field was completed by one national selection teams.

UCI WorldTeams

 
 
 

UCI Professional Continental teams

 
 
 
 
 
 
 
 

UCI Continental teams

 
 
 Aisan Racing Team
 
 
 
 Team 7Eleven-Sava RBP
 
 
 HKSI Pro Team

National teams

 Malaysia

Stages
The race comprises 8 stages, covering 1179 kilometres.

Classification leadership

Final standings

General classification

Points classification

Mountains classification

Asian rider classification

Team classification

Asian team classification

Riders who failed to finish

Stage results

Stage 1
24 February 2016 — Kangar, Perlis to Baling, Kedah,

Stage 2
25 February 2016 — Sungai Petani, Kedah to Georgetown, Penang,

Stage 3
26 February 2016 — Kulim, Kedah to Kuala Kangsar, Perak,

Stage 4
27 February 2016 — Ipoh, Perak to Cameron Highlands, Pahang,

Stage 5
28 February 2016 — Tapah, Perak to Kuala Lumpur,

Stage 6
29 February 2016 — Putrajaya to Rembau, Negeri Sembilan,

Stage 7
1 March 2016 — Seremban, Negeri Sembilan to Parit Sulong, Johor,

Stage 8
2 March 2016 — Batu Pahat, Johor to Melaka, Loop

Reference lists

External links
 Tour de Langkawi Official Website
 2016 Tour de Langkawi at cyclingnews.com

Tour de Langkawi
Tour de Langkawi
Tour de Langkawi